Małgorzata Górnicka (born 16 September 1979) is a Polish judoka.

Achievements

References
 

1979 births
Living people
Polish female judoka
Place of birth missing (living people)
21st-century Polish women